Hymns II – Shine on Us is a studio album by Christian recording artist Michael W. Smith. It was released exclusively at Cracker Barrel Old Country Store on January 29, 2016. This is Smith's second hymns album and second release with Cracker Barrel. In the US the album is also available digitally on iTunes and Amazon.

Critical reception
Hymns II – Shine on Us was met with positive reviews. Caitlin Lassiter of New Release Today rated the album with four stars out of five, stating that "With Hymns II: Shine On Us, Michael W. Smith once again proves why he's one of the greats in this industry as he takes timeless favorites and adds his unique touch--breathing incredible creative energy into them to make them feel revived." Matt Conner of CCM Magazine gave the album three-and-a-half stars out of five. Gary Durban at Worship Leader gave the album four stars out of five.

Commercial performance
The album debuted at No. 172 on Billboard 200 and No. 3 on Billboard Top Christian Albums with approximately 4000 copies sold in its first week of release. This album marks Smith's 29th Top 10 album.

Track listing

Charts

References 

Michael W. Smith albums
2016 albums
Sequel albums